Axioms is a compilation by British progressive rock band Asia, released in February 1999 by Recall 2 cd.

Track listing

References

Asia (band) albums
1999 compilation albums
Progressive rock compilation albums
Albums produced by Geoff Downes
Albums produced by John Payne (singer)